Lek Yuen Bridge is a pedestrian footbridge in Sha Tin New Town, New Territories, Hong Kong, across the Shing Mun River.

The uncovered concrete footbridge was built in 1988. It is about 160 m in length with a structural area of about 1,000 m2.

References

Pedestrian bridges in Hong Kong
Sha Tin